1,3-Propane sultone is the organosulfur compound with the formula (CH2)3SO3.  It is a cyclic sulfonate ester, a class of compounds called sultones. It is a readily melting colorless solid.

Synthesis
It may be prepared by the acid catalyzed reaction of allyl alcohol and sodium bisulfite.

Reactions
1,3-propane sultone is an activated ester and is susceptible to nucleophilic attack. It hydrolyzes to the  acid.

It has been used in the synthesis of specialist surfactants, such as CHAPS detergent.

Safety
Typical of activated esters, 1,3-propane sultone is an alkylating agent. 1,3-Propane sultone is toxic, carcinogenic, mutagenic, and teratogenic.

See also
 1,4-Butane sultone
 Dimethyl sulfate
 Vinylsulfonic acid
 Isethionic acid
 Sulfolane

References

Sultones